The Connecticut Wing Civil Air Patrol is the highest echelon of Civil Air Patrol in the state of Connecticut. Headquartered in Beers Hall at the Connecticut Valley Hospital campus in Middletown, Connecticut, Connecticut Wing (CTWG) has 14 primary subordinate units located throughout the state to help it carry out its missions. The missions include providing aerospace education and training for all of its members, teaching leadership skills to Connecticut youth, and performing various domestic emergency services for the United States of America in a noncombatant capacity.

Members were notably instrumental in major events during the Wing's 75-year history, carrying out operations in World War II, 9/11, and the Hurricane Katrina disaster. The Wing has received numerous awards and recognitions, including unit citations from the Northeast Region Headquarters and National Headquarters, as well as government recognition by local, state and federal officials. Several individual members, including most cadet officers, are recognized by the Connecticut General Assembly upon receiving their promotions. Governor M. Jodi Rell declared December 1, 2007, Civil Air Patrol Day in the State of Connecticut, in recognition of the continuing efforts of the Wing and held as an anniversary to the Wing's creation on December 1, 1941. The Wing currently has more than 700 members.

History
During World War II, Connecticut Wing was heavily involved in coastal patrol and anti-submarine missions along its section of the Atlantic coast. For this, it received two air medals from the U.S. government. Connecticut Wing also flew recovery operations to rescue American pilots who had lost their aircraft domestically. One of the Sikorsky S-39 Flying Boats used for recovery operations is now on display at the New England Air Museumat Bradley International Airport in Windsor Locks, Connecticut.

Among the other missions that Connecticut Wing currently performs is the Long Island Sound Patrol (LISP) program. LISP flies patrol missions across Long Island Sound during the summer months in coordination with the United States Coast Guard to provide more immediate assistance to vessels in distress. The Wing was credited with numerous finds and saves in the year following its inception in summer 2007, and plans are in effect to continue the program.

Current command structure

As of August 2021, the Wing Commander of CTWG is Col Matthew Valleau, The Vice Commander position is held by Lt Col James Whitesell. The Chief of Staff is Lt Col Carol Whalen. The Vice Commander is responsible for coordinating the wing echelon with the subordinate units, specifically the squadrons. The Vice Commander is also an assistant of the Wing Commander, serving as the coordinator of various special projects. The Chief of Staff is responsible for the staff members located at wing headquarters, who are independent of the individual squadrons. Finally, the Wing Commander is responsible for connecting the two groups and ensuring that the Chief of Staff uses the wing staff members to benefit the squadrons who receive these benefits through the Vice Commander.

Most of the wing-level staff positions fit into various departments led by directors. For example, Emergency Services Officer (DOS) and Ground Training Officer (GO) fit into the Operations Department, led by the Director of Operations (DO). Other positions are not in departments, such as the Finance Officer (FM) and Safety Officer (SE).

Wing staff members meet at the headquarters building, Beers Hall, on the Connecticut Valley Hospital campus in Middletown, Connecticut. They also attend monthly "staff call" meetings to improve internal communication.

Squadrons
All 12 of Connecticut's squadrons report directly to either the Western Connecticut Group or the Eastern Connecticut Group.  The Groups report to Wing Headquarters. There are also three non-standard squadrons (000, 001, and 999) under Wing HQ, and there are liaisons with units in other branches of the armed forces, including the AFROTC at the University of Connecticut, which partners with Civil Air Patrol (CAP).

Commanders

Col Peter Jensen began a history restoration project in 2007 in an effort to uncover as much about Connecticut Wing's history as possible. Photographs were found of all of the previous Wing commanders, and were restored by Wing staff members. Notable commanders of Connecticut Wing include Col Tier (née Hopkins), who was the niece of Lady Astor and the Civil Air Patrol's first female wing commander. Col Frost was slated to be the next Northeast Region commander after he relinquished command of the Wing, but he died before assuming command. Col Howard Palmer during his term as Wing commander established activities for the cadet membership, and the Col Howard E. Palmer Memorial Cadet Ball is conducted annually in his honor by the Connecticut Wing Cadet Advisory Council.

Icons and symbols
The most prominent icon representing the wing is the Connecticut Wing's patch, with an ultramarine blue background and bearing the image of its mascot, Connie the Search and Rescue Dog. The wing patch was required to be worn on the left sleeve of the battle dress uniform until 2006 when National Headquarters made it optional.
Each squadron also has a distinctive patch. A 2007 issue of Civil Air Patrol Volunteer magazine featured an image of all of Connecticut Wing's squadron patches surrounding the Wing patch.

Connecticut Wing is also symbolized by the name "Charter Oak", which precedes all CTWG radio callsigns.  Since Connecticut is in the Northeast region, it also uses callsigns that start with "CAP Stone", the Northeast region prefix.

Cadet activities

The largest cadet activity held by the Wing is the annual Summer Encampment. The 2008 Encampment, which was held at Norwich University in Vermont, is the first encampment not held in Niantic, Connecticut for a decade, as reported in the CAP Encampment Reports. The Encampment is being held jointly with New Hampshire and Vermont Wings.  There is also an Encampment, Non-Commissioned Officer Academy, Leadership School and Honor Guard Academy, all of which are being held at Otis Air Force Base. Connecticut Wing liaison for these multi-Wing encampments is Lt Col Valleau.

Lt Col Valleau also runs the application process as per national regulations for the National Cadet Special Activities in Civil Air Patrol.

Connecticut Wing was featured in the March 2007 edition of Civil Air Patrol Volunteer magazine for an event held at Hartford-Brainard Airport in Hartford, Connecticut, in conjunction with the Connecticut State Police, which provided volunteers side-by-side training with search-and-rescue dogs.
Connecticut Wing cadets are currently involved in a competition between squadrons in the field of model rocketry.  The final competition is to be held in June 2008 in conjunction with CATO Rocketry Club, the local chapter of the National Association of Rocketry.

The Wing's Cadet Advisory Council also hosts the annual Col Howard E Palmer Cadet Ball in recognition of the longest-serving Wing commander.  The event is held during the fall season each year and is intended as an informal social gathering to promote inter-squadron cooperation.  Nearly one half of the Wing's cadets attended the 2007 Cadet Ball, with an estimated 139 in attendance.

Additionally, Connecticut Wing holds an annual conference during October. This time is used to allow the Wing commander to address the entire Wing, for guest speakers to give keynote speeches, and for the annual awards to be presented to their recipients. Several competitions for the cadets occur at each conference, including a military drill and ceremonies competition and a public speaking competition. Col Mary Feik, after whom one of CAP's cadet awards is named in honor of her work in women's rights in aviation, was the keynote speaker at the 2007 conference.  It is also common to have government representatives attend, including members of the state legislature.

Recognition and accomplishments

The CAP National History project and National Museum most recognize CTWG for their involvement in coastal patrol missions during World War II, shortly after the creation of CAP. Since CAP was created in a time of crisis, when Brigadier General Billy Mitchell was warning the country of impending attack and less than a week before the attack on Pearl Harbor, Hawaii, coastal patrol and submarine searching became the prime missions of CAP.

In the New England Air Museum, located at Bradley International Airport in Windsor Locks, Connecticut, a Sikorsky S-39 Flying Boat can be found that was used during World War II for rescuing pilots of subchasers that had gone down. A local artist painted an oil painting of the aircraft, now prominently displayed next to it in the exhibit. Photos of the exhibit, the unveiling ceremony, and the oil painting can be found at the Wing Headquarters building.

The first two Air Medals presented by the president of the United States to Civil Air Patrol went to Hugh Sharp and Eddie Edwards, who conducted the rescue in the S-39. This successful program, which spotted 173 German U-Boats, dropped 57 depth charges, hit 10 of the U-Boats, and sank two of them, was inevitably discontinued after the end of the second World War. Many of the planes used specifically for this program are now parts of exhibits, replaced by new aircraft that are more suited to teaching young students to fly and performing search and rescue, the current missions of Civil Air Patrol. Currently, CTWG has two Cessna 172s, two Cessna 182s and one Cessna 182T with Garmin G1000 Glass cockpit. Connecticut Wing has the highest number of hours flown per aircraft of any state in the North East Region, and ranks high on a national scale.

The membership of CTWG grew from 500 to 600 total active members during the 2007 fiscal year, making the largest percent increase of any wing in CAP for that year, as was announced at the April 2007 Wing Conference in Cromwell, Connecticut.

See also
Awards and decorations of the Civil Air Patrol
Cadet grades and insignia of the Civil Air Patrol
United States Air Force Rescue Coordination Center

References

Further reading

External links
Official Wing website

Wings of the Civil Air Patrol